Fan Club is a Quebec television series broadcast on the specialized VRAK.TV youth channel.

The program launched on 28 August 2008, an artistic magazine program allowing youth to have access to their favourite celebrities for a typical day. The star usually gives a snap of his life as a celebrity and offers gifts and special favors to the winning "fan". 

For three seasons 2008 to 2010, the program was hosted by Yan England (who has also hosted series like Une grenade avec ça and Ramdam) and Magalie Lépine-Blondeau (R-Force). In the 4th season in 2011, Caroline Gendron (from Une grenade avec ça?) replaced Magalie Lépine-Blondeau, whereas Yan England stayed for a 4th season.

The program also featured a special segment "club sandwich" in which a selected star is challenged to consume a "specially prepared" sandwich of various ingredients. This segment was prepared by Jérémy Rodriguez-Carignan and Julien Adam for 3 seasons. In the fourth season (2011), the segment was hosted by Camille Felton and Antoine Blais.

Featured celebrities
Season 1 (2008-2009)
 Guy Jodoin
Jay Du Temple
Messmer
Debbie Lynch-White
Alice Morel-Michaud
Anne Casabonne
Sylvie Boucher
Yves Hébert
Alexe Gaudreault
Annie-Soleil Proteau
Philippe Laprise
Julie Snyder
 Garou
 Mariloup Wolfe
 Stéphane Bellavance
 Joël Legendre
 Sophie Cadieux
 Jean-François Baril
 Annie Villeneuve
 Benoit Gagnon
 Frank vs Girard
 Claude Legault
 Gildor Roy
 Sylvie Moreau 
 Réal Béland 
 Alexandre Morais
 Pierre Brassard
 Patrice L'Écuyer
 Le Père Noël
 Véronique Cloutier
 Mathieu Gaudet
 Éric Salvail
 Émily Bégin
 Bruno Blanchet
 Jonathan Painchaud
 Chéli
 Antoine Mongrain
 Prof d'école
 Marianne Moisan
 Alex Perron
 Michel Laperrière
 Dominic Philie
 Ricardo Larrivée
 Herby Moreau
 Roxanne Boulianne
 Stéphane Crête
 Sébastien Benoît
 Michel Bergeron
 François-Xavier Dufour
 Stéphane Archambault
 Réal Béland
 Julien et Jérémy
 Épisode 42

Season 2 (2009-2010)
 Roxanne Boulianne 
 Antoine Mongrain
 Jean Leloup
 Les Trois Accords
 Stéphane Fallu
 Annie Dufresne
 Julien Poulin
 Alexandre Barrette
 Koriass
 Xavier Morin-Lefort
 Mario Jean
 Virginie Coossa
 David Jalbert
 Guillaume Lemay-Thivierge
 Ima
 Dumas
 Louis Morissette
 Cathy Gauthier
 Patrick Groulx
 Gildor Roy
 Marc Gagnon
 François Arnaud
 Boom Desjardins
 Antoine L'Écuyer
 Rémi-Pierre Paquin
 Annie Brocoli
 Joël Bouchard
 Bruno Marcil
 Jocelyn Blanchard
 Les Justiciers Masqués
 Steve Veilleux
 Billy Tellier
 Stefie Shock
 Martin Brouillard
 Mirianne Brûlé
 Gino Chouinard
 Dominic Paquet
 Dominic Arpin
 Mike Ward

Season 3 (2010-2011)
 Claude Poirier
 Sébastien Buemi
 Marie-Mai
 K.Maro
 François Arnaud
 Hugo Girard
 Stéphanie Crête-Blais
 Jonas Brothers
 Duke Squad
 Joannie Rochette
 Sophie Vaillancourt
 Eric Paulhus
 Annie Larouche
 Les Grandes Gueules
 Hélène Florent
 Épisode 16
 Down with Webster
 Christmas special with Rachid Badouri 
 Christmas special with Gregory Charles
 Chantal Machabée
 Aliocha Schneider
 Bobby Bazini
 Marie-Mai
 Justin Bieber
 Joey Scarpellino
 Éric Lapointe
 Tournoi de hockey Pee-Wee de Québec (2011)
 Le Banquier (Julie Snyder & Marie-Pier Morin)
 Jean-Philippe Leguellec
 Mathieu Lavallée
 Marc Hervieux
 Laurent Paquin
 Pascal Morrissette
 Stéphane Bellavance
 Véronique Cloutier
 Pier-Luc Funk
 Roxanne Boulianne
 Nico Archambault

Season 4 (2011-2012)
 Marie-Soleil Dion
 Kaïn
 Bianca Gervais
 Kim St-Pierre and Caroline Ouellette
 Pierre Hébert
 Marie-Claude Savard
 Claude Meunier
 Davy Boisvert
 William Deslauriers
 Alexandre Morais
 Frédérique Dufort
 Émilie Heymans and Jennifer Abel
 Joannie Rochette 
 Maxime Landry and Jacob
 Ron Fournier 
 Spécial Grenade 
 Christmas special with Selena Gomez 
 New Year special 
 Alexandre Barrette 
 Vincent C 
 Julie St-Pierre 
 Valentine special with Cody Simpson 
 Emmy of Mixmania2
 Johanne Léveillée 
 Vincent Vallières 
 Tammy Verge
 Catherine Brunet
 Lars Eller 
 Lise Dion
 Sophie Cadieux 
 Théâtre Denise-Pelletier (Éric Paulhus)
 Jean-Michel Anctil
 Anne Dorval 
 The Wanted
 Billy Tellier

Television shows filmed in Quebec
Vrak original programming
2008 Canadian television series debuts
2014 Canadian television series endings
2000s Canadian children's television series
2010s Canadian children's television series